The Ohio Women's Hall of Fame was a program the State of Ohio's Department of Job and Family Services ran from 1978 through 2011.  The Hall has over 400 members.  In 2019, the Hall's physical archives and online records were transferred to the State Archives in the Ohio History Center.

History 
The Hall was created in 1978 within the Women's Programs at the Ohio Department of Job and Family Services.  The Hall "provided public recognition of the contributions Ohio women have made to the growth and progress of Ohio, the United States, and the world."

The Hall inducted women in the following categories:

After the program ended, its physical archives were transferred to the Ohioana Library, where they were held until they were transferred in 2019 to the State Archives in the Ohio History Center.

Inductees

References

Further reading

External links 

 Ohio Women's Hall of Fame webpage (Ohio Department of Job and Family Services website)
 Ohio Central History – Women
 Ohioana Library Association website

Halls of fame in Ohio
State halls of fame in the United States
Feminism and history
Lists of American women
Women's museums in the United States
Biographical museums in Ohio
Awards established in 1978
Women in Ohio
Women's halls of fame
1978 establishments in Ohio
History of women in Ohio